Qapaqtaz (also Romanized as Qapaqtāz and Qāpāqtāz) is a village in Balaband Rural District, in the Central District of Fariman County, Razavi Khorasan Province, Iran. At the 2006 census, its population was 51, in 12 families.

References 

Populated places in Fariman County